Matt Keikoan is an American professional poker player who has won two World Series of Poker bracelets; his first was in the 2008 World Series of Poker $2,000 No-Limit Hold'em event and his second was in the 2010 World Series of Poker $10,000 Limit Hold'em Championship. His 2010 WSOP bracelet is currently listed for sale on eBay due to big losses against Tom "durrr" Dwan in Ivey's Room at the Aria Hotel and Casino. There have been no offers made.

World Series of Poker 
Keikoan has 12 cashes at the World Series of Poker (WSOP) including coming in 63rd place at the 2007 World Series of Poker Main Event. On June 6, 2008, Keikoan won his first World Series of Poker bracelet  after defeating Shannon Shorr at the $2000 No Limit Holdem event.

Two years later, on June 18, 2010 at the 2010 World Series of Poker in the $10,000 Limit Hold'em Championship event, Keikoan began heads-ups play with Daniel Idema who had almost a 3-1 chip advantage against him.  He battled back to take the chip lead several times during the more than four-hour heads-up match and at one time he was severely crippled down to only 300,000 in chips while the blinds were at 120,000/240,000.  At that point Keikoan jokingly told his supporters in the audience that he was going to make “(the) greatest comeback in history right here.” and indeed did finish the come back to win his second bracelet and earning himself $425,969.

World Series of Poker bracelets

World Poker Tour 
Keikoan has seven cashes on the World Poker Tour (WPT), At the WPT Season VII, Keikoan nearly made the WPT final table at the 2008 Legends of Poker, finishing in 7th place, earning $140,830, then the next year made his first WPT final table finishing 5th at WPT Season VIII Bay 101 Shooting Star.

As of 2010, his total live tournament winnings exceed $1,800,000. His 12 cashes at the WSOP account for $1,290,876 of those winnings.

Notes

Year of birth missing (living people)
American poker players
American people of Samoan descent
Living people
World Series of Poker bracelet winners
World Series of Poker Circuit event winners